Hampton Hill, also known as the Bennet-Search House, is a historic home located at Richboro, Northampton Township, Bucks County, Pennsylvania. The first section was built about 1744, and is a -story, two-bay by one-bay, stone house with a gable roof.  The larger section was built about 1790, and is a -story, three-bay by two-bay, stone house with a gable roof. The roof was covered with slate in the 20th century. The house is thought to have harbored slaves on the Underground Railroad.

It was added to the National Register of Historic Places in 1973.

References

Houses on the Underground Railroad
Houses on the National Register of Historic Places in Pennsylvania
Houses completed in 1790
Houses in Bucks County, Pennsylvania
Populated places on the Underground Railroad
National Register of Historic Places in Bucks County, Pennsylvania
Underground Railroad in Pennsylvania